This article contains character information for the Singaporean Chinese family drama series Kinship.

Main characters

Chen Anping

Lin Meiqi

Chen Anxin

Lin Meixue

Chen Yingjun

Zheng Yusheng

Zheng Jinsha

Xu Naifa

Zheng Yinsha

Hong Zhaoyang
This Mr Goody-Two-Shoes has no temper at all and is a big softie at heart; Hong Zhaoyang only weakness is that his overly passionate and helpful nature can sometimes turn things for the worse.

Zhaoyang, once a superb swimming instructor, met his student Zheng Yinsha at the pool and love blossomed from there. He enjoys doing housework and cooking, and loves his wife and children extremely.

With a special passion for baking, Zhaoyang decides to rent a stall in the market to hawk his creations but is eventually conned of his money. He then takes over half of the stall space in his sister-in-law Zheng Jinsha's ice-cream parlour to sell his cakes. There, he becomes acquainted with Heping, a study mother, and incurs the suspect of his wife Yinsha for having an affair.

Hong Zhaoyang is played by Alan Tern.

Zhao Shuiling
Despite her sweet looks, Zhao Shuiling, or sometimes referred to as Lynn, is actually a superficial and jealous young woman who will stoop to any level to get what she wants.

She comes from a humble family background. Her father is a lorry driver and her mum, unable to take living a poor lifestyle, ran away deserting husband and daughter; from a young age, Shuiling thus vows to leave poverty behind when she grows up.

Shuiling works as a bar hostess to fulfill her dream of studying overseas. Once abroad, it becomes her goal to snare a rich man to marry, and the handsome Chen Yingjun, son to businessman Chen Anxin, becomes her willing target. Hiccups mar her otherwise perfect plan: their marriage is opposed strongly to by Yingjun's parents and Yingjun even leaves home in search of independence after a fall-out with his father.

Shuiling's feelings for Yingjun begin to waver. Eventually, the materialistic girl decides to marry the wealthy Chen Anxin instead. To cement her position in the Chen household, she repeatedly creates misunderstandings between Anxin and Yingjun. On the other hand, Shuiling is jealous of Yingjun's relationship with his new girlfriend and again wreaks havoc. To top off her devious plots, Shuiling links arms with Anxin's assistant Martin to frame Anxin.

Anxin and Chang Yi cooperates to reveal Shuiling's true colours, and when Martin finds out, he and Shuiling stuns both of them and throws them into the sea, leaving them to drown.

Shuiling then forges the legal assets authorization documents to seize control of Da Ying Jia. With the constant fear that Meixue may wake up one day to expose her evil deeds, and under repeated instigation by Martin, Shuiling and Martin end Meixue's life.

Anxin somehow survives the ordeal and returns as a Thai monk with the fervent hope to lead Shuiling to repentance. Shuiling however decides that there is no turning back and plans to embezzle large funds from Da Ying Jia with Martin. Yingjun decides to sue them when he learns of the embezzlement scheme and the forgery of the legal documents.

Shuiling later becomes mentally unstable and was sent to a mental hospital.

Zhao Shuiling is played by Eelyn Kok.

Zhang Wenya
Innocent and soft Zhang Wenya is totally opposite to tough cookie Zheng Yusheng but both are extremely close. After a chance meeting with Chen Yingjun, Wenya falls in love with him at first sight and with Yusheng's help, manages to get closer to Yingjun after his break-up with Zhao Shuiling. Wenya and Yingjun soon develop feelings for each other.

Wenya grew up with only her mother for support and both share a deep relationship. Her mum wants her to marry into a rich family and tries hard to fan the flames between Wenya and Yingjun. When she discovers the growing affections between Yingjun and Yusheng, the elderly lady listens to Shuiling's ‘advice' and pretends to suffer from aphasia in a bid to make Yingjun stay.

Wenya's life is in danger when she accidentally learns what both Shuiling and Martin have done.

Zhang Wenya is played by Carrie Yeo.

Wind
The lively and extroverted Wind is best pals with Chen Yingjun and will always stand up for him. Seeing red over Zhao Shuiling's cold-hearted ways, there are times when Wind is tempted to tell Chen Anxin about Shuiling's relationship with his son Yingjun but is stopped by the latter.

From young, Wind's ambition is to be a hair stylist but he ends up as a helper in a barber shop instead. Later, Lin Meiqi brings him home to stay and he develops affections for Zheng Yusheng.

Chen Anping sees the potential in Wind and offers him a job in the foot reflexology centre. Wind accepts the job to be closer to Yusheng but he gradually realizes his talent in foot reflexology and becomes Anping's protégé, thus becoming one of the ‘Four Heavenly Kings'. He remains devoted to Yusheng till he discovers the romance between her and Yingjun; then a complicated quadrangular relationship between Wind, Yingjun, Yusheng and Wenya results.

Wind later decide to pull out from the love triangle and flew back to his hometown in China.

Wind is played by Li Jianxun.

Martin
Martin or Mading, knows everything there is to know about Chen Anxin, and his job scope includes settling any trouble after his boss's many flings.

When he realises that Anxin has fallen in love with Zhao Shuiling, he hides the truth of Shuiling being Chen Yingjun's girlfriend from him and even hooks Anxin up with Shuiling.

Martin is especially impressed with Shuiling's intelligence and deviousness, and goes all out to please her. With Shuiling's constant fear that Meixue may wake up one day to expose her evil deeds, and under repeated instigation by Martin, Shuiling and Martin end Meixue's life. Martin plans to flee even as Shuiling goes berserk.

Martin is played by Brandon Wong.

Chang Ying
Chang Ying opened a massage parlour near Anping's parlour just to rival him and gain customers. After his parlour was set on fire by an arsonist, he immediately suspects Yusheng who left in a huff after their first meeting. After learning that Yusheng is his daughter, he repents and turns over a new leaf. Anxin and Chang Yi cooperates to reveal Shuiling's true colours, and when Martin finds out, Martin and Shuiling stuns both of them and throws them into the sea, leaving them to drown.

Chang Ying is lucky to survive the murder attempt but he assumes a new identity as Zhen Zixin, a private investigator. Through various investigation tactics, he attempts to bring to Yusheng's knowledge Shuiling and Martin's despicable schemes, and at the same time, re-build their bond as father and daughter.

Chang Ying is played by Zhang Wen Xiang.

Ying Lishi

Li Zhongshang

Supporting characters

Qian Duoduo

Heping

Youmei

Li Dawei

References
Character profile
Character Map

External links
Kinship official website

Lists of drama television characters